Spring Records was an American record label established in New York City in 1967. It was formed out of an artist and  production management company set up earlier by Bill Spitalsky, Roy Rifkind and Julie Rifkind.  The label name came from their surnames, "Sp" for Spitalsky and "ri" for Rifkind.  It was associated with the Polydor group.
 
It primarily released soul and funk music,  and was described as "one of the most important soul labels of the 1970s".  Initial recordings were distributed through MGM Records, but it was later associated with the Polydor group, which handled distribution and marketing.

The label released successful recordings once it got into its stride in 1970, mainly by Millie Jackson, Joe Simon, and The Fatback Band, as well as Jocelyn Brown, Garland Green, and Paul Evans. It also started two subsidiary labels, Event and Posse. Spring's in-house producer for a large part of the 1970s was Raeford Gerald, who worked with both Jackson and 
Simon, but the label also used other producers, such as Brad Shapiro (for Millie Jackson), John Richbourg (for Joe Simon) and The Fatback Band handled their own production.

Spring ended its association with Polydor, by then known as PolyGram, in 1983, but continued as an independent label for some years, mainly releasing disco tracks. The major selling acts of the 1970s by then had left the label. The company was formally wound up in  1993.

Jules Rifkind is the father of Steve Rifkind, founder of Loud Records. Roy Rifkind is the father of Randy and Jaimison Roberts. Randy was the drummer and a founding member of the Buchanan Brothers, who briefly toured with The Beach Boys. Roberts went on to be a prominent music attorney.

References

External links
 Spring Records discography
  Dick Nusser, "Spring Flows On 3 Acts With Desire For Personal Services", Billboard, 25 March 1978, p. 18

Mass media companies based in New York City
New York (state) record labels
Soul music record labels